"In the End" is a song by American singer Kat DeLuna's. It served as the fourth single from DeLuna's debut album 9 Lives.

Music video
The music video was shot in mid-2008 and was released on her official YouTube page on October 31, 2008. It shows DeLuna singing and dancing in front of a white and stripped background, wearing various outfits. The video is intercut with scenes of her performing the song with a microphone.

Charts

References

External links

Video

Kat DeLuna songs
2008 singles
Songs written by Claude Kelly
Songs written by RedOne
Song recordings produced by RedOne
Songs written by Kat DeLuna
2007 songs
Epic Records singles